A spirit guide is an entity that remains as a disincarnate spirit to act as a guide or protector to a living incarnated human being.

Spirit guide may also refer to:
 "Spirit Guide" (song), 2017 song from Decrepit Birth album Axis Mundi

See also
 Guardian spirit (disambiguation)
 Spiritual direction, personal assistance with someone's spiritual growth
 Totem, a spirit being, sacred object, or symbol that serves as an emblem of a group of people